The Fairview Amusement Hall, at 75 S. State St. in Fairview, Utah, was built in 1927.  It was listed on the National Register of Historic Places in 2002.

It was built by building contractor Allie Carlston with Oscar Amundsen and his son Whit doing the brick work.

References

National Register of Historic Places in Sanpete County, Utah
Late 19th and Early 20th Century American Movements architecture
Buildings and structures completed in 1927